Psorothamnus scoparius is a thornless bush in the bean family (Fabaceae), native to North America. It is known as broom smokebush and broom dalea.

Distribution and habitat
Psorothamnus scoparius is native to the southwestern United States, from western Texas through New Mexico to eastern Arizona, and the northernmost western regions of Mexico.

Description
Broom dalea is a short shrub with cyan colored branches and small purple flowers.

References

scoparius
Taxa named by Asa Gray
Flora of North America